Zaur Mauladinovich Kaziev (born 30 August 1983) is a Russian former footballer.

Playing career

* - played games and goals

References

1983 births
Living people
Russian footballers
Dinaburg FC players
Russian expatriate footballers
Expatriate footballers in Latvia
FC Spartak Vladikavkaz players
Ossetian people
Russian expatriate sportspeople in Latvia
Association football forwards
FC Sheksna Cherepovets players
FC Znamya Truda Orekhovo-Zuyevo players
FC Olimp-Dolgoprudny players